The Vilayet of Erzurum was a first-level administrative division (vilayet) of the Ottoman Empire.

The vilayet of Erzurum shared borders with the Persian and Russian empires in the east and north-east, in the north with the Trebizond Vilayet, in the west with the vilayet of Sivas, and in the south with the vilayets of Bitlis, Mamuret-ül Aziz and Van.

The accuracy of the population figures ranges from "approximate" to "merely conjectural" depending on the region from which they were gathered. It was one of the six Armenian vilayets in the eastern part of Anatolia, and, prior to World War I, many Armenians lived there. Also there lived small communities of Georgians, Pontic Greeks and Caucasus Greeks, and other ethnic groups, both Muslim and Christian [mainly Armenian Apostolic].

History
The Erzurum Eyalet was one of the first Ottoman provinces to become a vilayet after an administrative reform in 1865, and by 1867 it had been reformed into the Erzurum Vilayet.

In 1875 it was divided in six vilayets: Erzurum, Van, Hakkari, Bitlis, Hozat (Dersim) and Kars-Çildir. In 1888 by an imperial order Hakkari was joined to the vilayet of Van, and Hozat to Mamuret ul-Aziz.

The Kars and Çildir regions were lost in the Russo-Turkish War (1877–1878) and ceded to the Russian Empire, which administered it as the Kars Oblast until 1917.

Administrative divisions

Sanjaks of the vilayet: 
 Sanjak of Erzurum (Erzurum, Pasinler, Bayburt, İspir, Tercan, Tortum, Yusufeli, Kiğı, Narman, Hınıs)
 Sanjak of Erzincan (Erzincan, Pülümür, Refahiye, İliç, Kemah)
 Sanjak of Bayazid (Beyazit, Eleşkirt, Diyadin, Tutak, Ağrı)

Demographics
In 1893, there were in total 19 Kaza (districts). In all kaza's Muslims (Sunni and Alevi) were the majority. Lowest percentage of Muslims (64%) was in the kaza of Hınıs. Most of the Protestants and Catholics were Armenian.

See also
 Western Armenia

References

External links
 
 

 
Vilayets of the Ottoman Empire in Anatolia
Ottoman period in Armenia
History of Ağrı Province
History of Artvin Province
History of Bingöl Province
History of Bayburt Province
History of Erzincan Province
History of Erzurum Province
History of Tunceli Province
1867 establishments in the Ottoman Empire
1923 disestablishments in the Ottoman Empire